The 1927 Campeonato Paulista was the 26th season of São Paulo's top association football league. Two championships were disputed that season, each by a different league (APEA and LAF).

LAF Championship

In the edition organized by the LAF (Liga dos Amadores de Futebol), from April 3 to October 30. Paulistano won the title for the 10th time. no teams were relegated and the top scorer was Friedenreich with 13 goals.

System
The championship was disputed in a single round-robin system, with the team with the most points winning the title.

Championship

APEA Championship

In the edition organized by the APEA (Associação Paulista de Esportes Atléticos) from March 3, 1927 to March 11, 1928. Palestra Itália won the title for the 3rd time. no teams were relegated and the top scorer was Araken with 31 goals.

System
The championship was disputed in a single round-robin system, with the team with the most points winning the title.

Championship

References

Campeonato Paulista seasons
Paulista